Long Eaton Grange F.C. was a football club based in Long Eaton, Derbyshire. It competed in the Midland League, Northern Counties East League and Central Midlands League.

References

Defunct football clubs in Derbyshire
East Midlands Regional League
Midland Football League (1889)
Northern Counties East Football League
Central Midlands Football League
Defunct football clubs in England